A Neo-Gaeltacht is an area where Irish has a strong presence as a spoken language but is not part of the officially defined or traditional Gaeltacht areas. It has been argued that non-Gaeltacht activist groups wishing to establish an Irish language community need to show that it is large, permanent and formally organised and that it has a growing number of people using Irish as their first language. Another objective is a situation in which children use Irish among themselves and with other Irish speakers in a natural way while being able to deal with a largely English-speaking world.

Under the Gaeltacht Act 2012 the Republic of Ireland's Department of Tourism, Culture, Arts, Gaeltacht, Sport and Media has said that areas outside the traditional Gaeltacht areas may be designated as Líonraí Gaeilge/Irish Language Networks, subject to them fulfilling particular criteria. In 2018 Foras na Gaeilge announced that Carn Tóchair in County Londonderry was going to be one of the first five Líonraí Gaeilge (areas with Irish-speaking networks) on the island of Ireland, along with West Belfast, Loughrea in County Galway, Ennis in County Clare, and Clondalkin in Dublin.

Northern Ireland

Belfast

In 2002, a major report of the West Belfast Task Force recommended turning part of West Belfast into  /The Gaeltacht Quarter. The Joint West Belfast/Greater Shankill Task Force Report stated that the aim of the Quarter is to "secure wealth creation by maximising the economic opportunities provided by a growing cluster of Irish Language and cultural based enterprises and activities which additionally have significant tourist potential". The proposal has been accepted and put into force by the Department of Culture, Arts and Leisure in Northern Ireland.

Belfast's Gaeltacht Quarter is now an area in which the Irish language is spoken widely. The area has Irish-speaking staff members working in local restaurants and agencies and is home to both  (the city's biggest Irish language cultural centre) and Irish language development organisation . The Gaeltacht Quarter also hosts the community radio station , Northern Ireland's only full-time Irish language radio station which broadcasts across Belfast and which seeks to get a license on FM to broadcast across the state.

In 2018  announced that Belfast was going to be one of the first five  on the island of Ireland.

South County Londonderry
In 2008 two local organisations launched a "strategy for the rebirth of the Gaeltacht", based on Irish-medium primary and secondary education. Announcing the launch, the Republic of Ireland's Minister for the Gaeltacht, said that the area was "an example to other areas all over Ireland which are working to reestablish Irish as a community language".

In 2018  announced that  was going to be one of the first five  on the island of Ireland, along with Belfast, Loughrea, Ennis and Clondalkin.

Republic of Ireland

Urban language networks
The 2016 census showed that Dublin had the largest concentration of daily Irish speakers, with 14,229 speakers representing 18 percent of such speakers throughout the country. In a survey of a small sample of adults who had grown up in Dublin and had completed full-time education, 54% of respondents reported some fluency in Irish, ranging from being able to make small talk to complete fluency. Only 19% of speakers spoke Irish three or more times per week, with a plurality (43%) speaking Irish less than once a fortnight.

There have been several proposals over the years, as in Cork in the 1960s, to establish an urban Neo-Gaeltacht. There is no evidence that this project is still considered viable.

In 2018  announced that under the Gaeltacht Act 2012 Loughrea, Ennis and Clondalkin in the Republic of Ireland were going to be officially recognised among the first five  (Irish Language Networks) on the island of Ireland along with Belfast and Carn Tóchair in Northern Ireland.

West Clare

Parts of County Clare were recognised as Gaeltacht areas following recommendations made by Coimisiún na Gaeltachta in 1925. This was enacted by law under the Gaeltacht (Housing) Acts 1929-2001. There were Irish speakers west of Ennis in Kilmihil, Kilrush, Doonbeg, Doolin, Ennistimon, Carrigaholt, Lisdoonvarna and Ballyvaughan. Census figures for Gaeltacht areas in Clare for 1926 show 9,123 female Irish speakers and 10,046 male speakers.

Statutory Rules and Orders 1933 No. 85 Vocational Education (Gaeltacht) Area 1933 was made under section 103 of the Vocational Education Act 1930 and set out the names of District Electoral Divisions in Ennis, Ennistymon, Kilrush and Miltown Malbay that formed part of the Gaeltacht in the Administrative County of Clare. This Statutory Instrument (S.I. No. 85 of 1933) appears to be still on the statute books. In 1956, however, it was decided that there were too few traditional speakers in County Clare to justify its inclusion in the Official Gaeltacht.

The main group promoting the language in Clare is Coiste Forbartha na Gaeltachta Chontae an Chláir (The Gaeltacht Development Committee for County Clare). It says that there is a demand for Gaeltacht status. It has also claimed that native speakers who received grants under the Scéim Labhairt na Gaeilge, a scheme first established by the State in 1933 with the aim of  supporting the language among traditional speakers, still live in the county and speak Irish. In 2012 it claimed that there were 170 daily speakers. The chair of the Committee, Seosamh Mac Ionnrachtaigh, has stated that West Clare is a "Breac-Ghaeltacht" (an area where traditional Irish is still heard to some degree). There are, however, no official statistics to confirm the number of daily speakers locally.

Between 2012 and 2018 Coiste Forbartha Gaeltachta Chontae an Chláir published In Ard an Tráthnóna Siar, an Irish-language journal devoted to the restoration of traditional Irish in West Clare.

Events in Clare where Irish is used are regularly organised by language activists. The language group An Clár as Gaeilge organises the festivals Féile na hInse and An Fhéile Scoldrámaíochta, and encourages businesses to use the language. There are also weekly language classes.

North America

Tamworth-Erinsville, Ontario is a planned Neo-Gaeltacht area in Canada. It is unusual in having no resident Irish speakers, serving instead as a meeting place for Irish speakers from elsewhere, and therefore a link for otherwise dispersed networks.

See also
 Language revitalization
 Gaeltacht Act 2012
 
 
 Status of the Irish language

Notes

References
Mac Póilin, Aodán (2006), ‘The Universe of the Gaeltacht’ in Andrew Higgins Wyndham (ed.), Re-Imagining Ireland. University of Virginia Press. 

Gaeltacht places
Planned communities